Campari is a bitter alcoholic aperitif.

Campari may also refer to:

 Campari Group, an Italian company which produces the aperitif and other alcoholic beverages
 Campari America, a subsidiary launched in 1992
 Campari tomato, a popular variety of tomato in North America
 Gaspare Campari (1828–1882), inventor of the aperitif
 Giuseppe Campari (1892–1933), Italian opera singer and Grand Prix motor racing driver
 Campari Knoepffler (born 1959), Nicaraguan Olympic swimmer
CaMPARI, a photoconvertible calcium sensor